Abbandando is a surname. Notable people with the surname include:

Frank Abbandando (1910–1942), American contract killer

Fictional characters
Genco Abbandando, a character in the novel The Godfather

Italian-language surnames